FOX 24 may refer to one of the following television stations in the United States that are currently affiliated or were former affiliates with the Fox Broadcasting Company:

Current
KFTA-TV, Fort Smith, Arkansas
KKFX-CD, San Luis Obispo, California
KPEJ-TV, Odessa, Texas
WGXA, Macon, Georgia
WTAT-TV, Charleston, South Carolina

Former
WCGV-TV, Milwaukee, Wisconsin